Sara Borrell Ruiz (Madrid, Spain 1917 - Madrid, Spain 1999) was a Spanish scientist, pharmacist and biochemist known for her pioneering work on the analysis and metabolism of steroid hormones.

Biography 
Sara Borrell Ruiz grew up in Madrid in a liberal family in favour of women's higher education. Her mother, Sara Ruiz Albéniz, was a teacher, an artist, and the niece of the Spanish composer Isaac Albéniz, who worked as assistant of the painter Cecilio Plá. Her father, José Borrell, was a pharmacist from a family that owned a pharmacy in the centre of the Spanish capital and a member of the party "Izquierda Republicana" who was incarcerated for the first years of the Spanish Franco's dictatorship. This environment explains Sara's education and scientific choices.

She tried to enrol at university as an agricultural engineer like her brother, but she wasn't accepted due to her gender, She then decided to study pharmacy at the University of Madrid (a predecessor of the Complutense University of Madrid) in 1933. Her studies were interrupted by the Spanish Civil War (1936-1939), but she completed her degree in 1940 and her doctorate in 1944 with a PhD thesis on the composition of the waters of the Tagus river.

Scientific career 

She started working in 1935 in the analytical chemistry laboratory at the University of Madrid where she learned quantitative analysis techniques. While completing her doctorate in the tough post-war era in Spain, she became more interested in hygiene and nutrition. From 1941 to 1949, she worked as assistant professor of Bromatology at the University of Madrid. In 1946, she left Spain to carry out postdoctoral research at the Hanna Dairy Research Institute in Ayr, Scotland. She learned the analysis and manipulation of milk proteins, which was a field in which she specialized.

In 1949, she became a researcher with tenure at the Spanish National Research Council (CSIC) and the following year Gregorio Marañón asked her to join the new Institute of Experimental Endocrinology (at the CSIC) to work on the biochemistry of hormones. To complete her training in the field, in 1950 she went to Cambridge, England to work at the Dunn Nutritional Laboratory and later at the Courtauld Institute for Chemistry at Middlesex Hospital in London. In 1953 she worked on the biochemistry of steroid hormones with Gregory Pincus at the Worcester Foundation for Experimental Biology in Shrewsbury, Massachusetts, United States.

Back in Spain, she managed the Steroids Division of the "Gregorio Marañón Institute", which was created after the death of the Spanish physician, scientist and philosopher. In 1963 she was a founding member of the Spanish Society for Biochemistry. In 1983 she moved to the new Cajal Institute (CSIC) where she remained until her retirement in 1989.

Legacy 
Her research lead to publications in scientific journals such as Hormone Research Journal of Endocrinology,  Biochemical Journal and Nature.

Many young researchers were trained or supervised by her and the Carlos III Health Institute gave Sara Borrell's name to a Grant program of postdoctoral training that is still in existence.

References 

1917 births
1999 deaths
People from Madrid
Spanish women scientists
Spanish biochemists